The St. Charles Streetcar Line is a historic streetcar line in New Orleans, Louisiana. Running since 1835, it is the oldest continuously operating streetcar line in the world. It is operated by the New Orleans Regional Transit Authority (RTA). Officially the St. Charles Streetcar line is designated as Route 12, and it runs along its namesake, St. Charles Avenue. It is the busiest route in the RTA system as it is heavily used by local commuters and tourists. On most RTA maps and publications, it is denoted in green, which is also the color of the streetcars on this line.

The St. Charles Streetcar Line is listed on the National Register of Historic Places and is one of only two street railways National Historic Landmarks, along with the San Francisco cable car system.

Route 
The St. Charles line starts uptown, at South Carrollton Avenue and South Claiborne Avenue. It runs on South Carrollton Avenue through the Carrollton neighborhood towards the Mississippi River, then near the river levee turns on to St. Charles Avenue. With the exception of Carondelet Street and the downtown portion of St. Charles where the line runs in the curbside lane, most of the line runs in the neutral ground (the median strip) with greenery between the tracks.

History 
Planning for the line began in 1831, and work began as the New Orleans and Carrollton Railroad in February 1833, the second railway in Greater New Orleans after the Pontchartrain Railroad. Passenger and freight services by steam locomotives began on September 26, 1835, originally without a dedicated right-of-way (it ran on public streets), although one was eventually established in the neutral ground (the median). Service began as a suburban railroad, since Carrollton was at that time a separate city, while areas along the route were still mostly undeveloped. Two locomotives New Orleans and Carrollton were supplied from England by B. Hick and Sons.

As the area along the line became more urbanized, objections to the soot and noise produced by the locomotives increased, and transport was switched to cars that were powered by horses and mules. For decades in the late 19th century, desire for a mode of transit more swift and powerful than horses but without the disruptive effects of locomotives resulted in a number of systems being tried out. Experimental systems included overhead cable propulsion (with a cable clamp patented by P.G.T. Beauregard in 1869 later being adapted for the San Francisco cable car system), and several innovative designs by Dr. Emile Lamm, including ammonia engines, a "Chloride of Calcium Engine", and most successfully Lamm Fireless Engine which not only propelled pairs of cars along the line in the 1880s but was adopted by the street railways of Paris.

While the city's first experiments with electric-powered cars were made in 1884 (in conjunction with the World Cotton Centennial World's Fair), electric streetcars were not considered sufficiently developed for widespread use until the following decade, and the line was electrified February 1, 1893. At the same time, it was extended from the corner of St. Charles and Carrollton Avenues out Carrollton to a new car barn at Willow Street.

In 1900, the St. Charles and Tulane streetcar lines were extended on Carrollton Avenue and connected together, resulting in a two-way belt line. Cars signed St. Charles left Canal Street on Baronne Street to Howard Avenue to St. Charles Avenue, thence all the way to Carrollton and out that avenue, returning to the central business district on Tulane Avenue. Streetcars leaving Canal Street on Tulane Avenue were signed Tulane, operating out to Carrollton Avenue, then turning riverward to St. Charles Avenue, passing Lee Circle to Howard Avenue, and finally down Baronne (later Carondelet) to Canal Street.

In 1922 the New Orleans & Carrollton Rail Road was merged into New Orleans Public Service Incorporated (NOPSI), which consolidated the city's various streetcar lines and electrical production.

In 1950, plans were made to fill in the New Basin Canal, which the Belt Lines crossed on a bridge on Carrollton Avenue. The right of way was to be used for the Pontchartrain Expressway, and Carrollton Avenue traffic was to use an underpass. Rather than rebuild tracks in the underpass, the Tulane and St. Charles lines were separated, and Tulane Avenue was converted to a trolley coach line. During construction, the St. Charles line continued to operate (in both directions) all the way on Carrollton Avenue from St. Charles Avenue to the underpass construction site at Dixon Street. Once the underpass was completed, the St. Charles streetcar line was cut back to Claiborne Avenue, as it operates at present, and the Tulane trolley coach line took over the part of Carrollton Avenue between Tulane Avenue and Claiborne.

In 1972 automatic fareboxes were introduced, and the job of a separate conductor was eliminated from the streetcars. The line still has one of the Ford, Bacon & Davis 1894 vintage cars in running condition. Although it is not used for passenger service, it stays busy with work operations such as track sanding. The rest of the line's cars date from 1923–24.

In 1973, preservationists successfully listed the St. Charles line on the National Register of Historic Places. But it is not possible to provide the historic cars with wheelchair access doors and lifts in compliance with the Americans with Disabilities Act (ADA). For this reason, it has been the only service in the system not to have wheelchair access.

In 1983, the RTA was created to oversee public transportation in New Orleans. It assumed the operations of city bus lines and the St. Charles line from NOPSI, which has since folded into Entergy.

In 2005, service along the route was suspended due to damage from Hurricane Katrina and the floods from levee breaches. The small section from Canal Street to Lee Circle was the first part restored. The section continuing up to Napoleon Avenue was re-opened for service on November 11, 2007, and on December 23, 2007, was extended up to Carrollton Avenue, near the line's original terminus in 1833. The restoration of the line on the remaining section along Carrollton Avenue to Claiborne Avenue took place on June 22, 2008.

The St. Charles line was listed by the National Park Service as a National Historic Landmark in 2014. This recognizes it as a place that possesses "exceptional value and quality in illustrating or interpreting the heritage of the United States," quoting the announcement from the Department of the Interior. It joins the San Francisco cable car system as one of only two moving streetcar National Historic Landmarks. (There are other moving landmarks, such as ships and trains.)

Following a lawsuit over access for wheelchair and other limited mobility patrons, RTA entered into a consent decree in 2017, agreeing to make six stops (each end, as well as Napoleon, Louisiana, Jackson, and a then-undetermined stop near Riverbend) ADA compliant. At least one wheelchair lift-equipped car was to be added to the line, but the historic Perley Thomas streetcars were not to be modified.

In 2020, to comply with the 2017 consent decree, RTA renovated three streetcars (and later a fourth) that had originally been built with wheelchair accessible features for Riverfront service, bringing the St. Charles streetcar line into compliance with the 1990 Americans with Disabilities Act (ADA). This included repainting these cars from Riverfront red to the iconic St. Charles line green. The cars carry a wheelchair icon on their ends and sides. RTA also rebuilt car stops at six major intersections to allow wheelchair access. Wheelchair accessible service on the St. Charles line began on December 1, 2020.

Operation 
The St. Charles Streetcar line operates 24 hours a day, with frequent service most of the day (7 a.m. to 10 p.m.), with cars coming every nine minutes. Cars operate every 18 minutes early morning (before 7 a.m.) and late night (10 p.m. to midnight), with 36 minute intervals in the night owl period (midnight to 6 a.m.).

The principal equipment of the line consists of 35 streetcars built in 1923–24 by the Perley Thomas Car Co. They have been rebuilt several times during their long service life.

List of streetcar stops 
From Canal Street to Uptown

See also 

History of New Orleans
List of National Historic Landmarks in Louisiana
National Register of Historic Places listings in Orleans Parish, Louisiana

References

External links 

St. Charles Streetcar line schedule

Passenger rail transportation in Louisiana
Transportation in New Orleans
Light rail in Louisiana
Heritage streetcar systems
New Orleans
Historic American Engineering Record in Louisiana
National Historic Landmarks in Louisiana
Railroad-related National Historic Landmarks
National Register of Historic Places in New Orleans
Railway lines on the National Register of Historic Places
Rail infrastructure on the National Register of Historic Places in Louisiana